The Queen Mathilde Fund (from 2001 to 2013 Princess Mathilde Fund) is a Belgian foundation named after Queen Mathilde of Belgium. The fund was created from the donations the queen received on her wedding with then-Prince Philippe and is aimed towards the most vulnerable people in Belgian society.

Queen Mathilde Prize
Since 2001 the Queen Mathilde Prize is awarded annually to support special initiatives that seek to strengthen the position of people and groups in Belgium who are socially more vulnerable.

See also
 Fabiola of Belgium
 King Baudouin Foundation

References

Sources
 monarchie.be

External links
 Queen Mathilde Fund

Foundations based in Belgium
Charities based in Belgium